The Munich Codex Hebraica 95 ("Munich, Beyerische Staatbibliothek, Cod. Heb. 95) was written by Solomon b. Samson (Shlomo ben Shimshon) in France. He completed his copying task in 1342. It is the only existing handwritten copy of the entire Babylonian Talmud "without Chrisitian censorship."

Ease of tracing ownership has been facilitated since "numerous owners" wrote their name. It has been described as "containing 577 pages."

Munich naming 
The original owner can't be determined, since a subsequent owner erased that owner's name, a practice that subsequent owners did not follow. Although it was written in France, it stopped moving from private owner to private owner when, together with other Jewish works, it was transferred to a government owned library in Munich, "and hence its name." The 95 reflects how it was cataloged.

The Munich Bayerische Staatsbibliothek's origin in the 16th century, particularly its holding of Hebrew and Yiddish language articles, can be viewed here.

An online copy of what is sometimes called The Munich Talmud is available here, although "it doesn't number individual pages with the 'modern' numbering system."

References

Talmud
Jewish texts
Jewish history